Ilya Meyerovich Sobol’ (born 15 August 1926) is a Russian mathematician, known for his work on Monte Carlo methods. His research spans several applications, from nuclear studies to astrophysics, and has contributed significantly to the field of sensitivity analysis.

Biography
Ilya Meyerovich Sobol’ was born on August 15, 1926, in Panevėžys (Lithuania). When World War II reached Lithuania his family was evacuated to Izhevsk. Here Sobol’ attended high school which he finished in 1943 with distinction. Sobol’ then moved to Moscow at the Faculty of Mechanics and Mathematics of Moscow State University, where he graduated with distinction in 1948. Ilya Meyerovich Sobol’ recognizes Aleksandr Khinchin, Viktor Vladimirovich Nemytskii, and A. Kolmogorov as his teachers.

In 1949, Sobol’ joined a laboratory of the Geophysical Complex Expedition at the Institute of Geophysics of the USSR Academy of Sciences led by Andrey Nikolayevich Tikhonov. This laboratory was subsequently merged with the Institute of Applied Mathematics of the USSR Academy of Sciences.

He has been for many years professor at the Department of Mathematical Physics of the Moscow Engineering Physics Institute, and was an active contributor to  the Journal of Computational Mathematics and Mathematical Physics.

Contribution 
I.M. Sobol’ has contributed to the scientific literature with about one hundred and seventy scientific papers and several textbooks.

In his student years, Sobol’ was actively engaged in solving various mathematical problems. His first scientific works concerning ordinary differential equations were published in renowned mathematical journals in 1948. Some of his subsequent studies were also devoted to this subject. During his years at the Institute of Applied Mathematics Sobol’ took part in the computations for the first Soviet atomic and hydrogen bombs. He also worked with Alexander Samarskii on the computation of temperature waves.

In 1958, Sobol’ started to work on pseudo-random numbers, then to move on developing new approaches which were later called quasi-Monte Carlo methods (QMC). He was the first to use the Haar functions in mathematical applications. Sobol’ defended his D.Sc. dissertation "The Method of Haar Series in the Theory of Quadrature Formulas" in 1972. The results were previously published in his well-known monograph "Multidimensional Quadrature Formulas and Haar Functions" 

Sobol’ applied Monte Carlo methods in various scientific fields, including astrophysics. He was actively working with a prominent physicist Rashid Sunyaev on Monte-Carlo calculations of X-ray source spectra which led to discovery of the Sunyaev-Zel'dovich effect, which is due to electrons associated with gas in galaxy clusters scattering the cosmic microwave background radiation.
<ref name="Sunyaev">L.A. Pozdniakov, I.M. Sobol', R.A. Sunyaev ``Comptonization and the shaping of X-ray source spectra - Monte-Carlo calculations, Soviet Scientific Reviews, Section E: Astrophysics and Space Physics Reviews, 1983, 2, 189-331.</ref>

He is especially known for developing a new quasi-random number sequence known as LPτ sequence,I.M. Sobol’, Uniformly distributed sequences with an addition uniform property, USSR Comput. Maths. Math. Phys. 16 (1976) 236–242.
 or Sobol’ sequences. These are now known as digital (t,s)-sequences in base 2, and they can be used to construct digital (t,m,s)-nets. Sobol’ demonstrated that these sequences are superior to many existing competing methods
(see a review in Bratley and Fox, 1988 ). For this reason Sobol’ sequences are widely used in many fields, including finance, for the evaluation of integrals, optimization, experimental design, sensitivity analysis and finance 

. The key property of Sobol’ sequences is that they provide greatly accelerated convergence rate in Monte Carlo integration when compared with what can be obtained using pseudo-random numbers. His achievements in astrophysics include application of Monte Carlo methods to the mathematical simulation of X-ray and gamma spectra of compact relativistic objects. He studied particle transmission (neutrons, photons). His contributions to sensitivity analysis include the development of the sensitivity indices which bear his name (Sobol’ indices
), including global sensitivity indices 
.I.M. Sobol’, A. Saltelli, "Sensitivity Analysis of Nonlinear Mathematical Models: Numerical Experience," Mat. Model. 7 (11), 16–28, (1995). 

Sobol’, together with R. Statnikov, proposed a new approach to the problems of multi-objective optimization and multi-objective decision making. This approach allows researchers and practitioners to solve the problems with non-differentiable objective functions and non-linear constraints. These results are described in their monograph 
One of his best known books is Monte Carlo Methods'', originally published in 1968, was translated into five languages, and revised in a US version in 1994. Sobol’ has the highest Citation Index among living Russian mathematicians. He also contributed to the first multi-author book on sensitivity analysis.

References

External links
 Link to the Monte Carlo Primer
 Google books page for I.M. Sobol’ primer on Monte Carlo Methods
  Sensitivity analysis papers
   A page devoted to I.M. Sobol’ from Wilmott magazine
 Dedication to I.M. Sobol’ of a recent book on sensitivity analysis

1926 births
Lithuanian Jews
Living people
Russian Jews
Russian mathematicians
Soviet mathematicians
Russian people of Lithuanian-Jewish descent
Moscow State University alumni